Fred Hemke, DMA (né Frederick Leroy Hemke Jr.; July 11, 1935 – April 17, 2019) was an American virtuoso classical saxophonist and influential professor of saxophone at Northwestern University.  Hemke helped raise the popularity of classical saxophone, particularly among leading American composers and helped raise the recognition of classical saxophone in solo, chamber, and major orchestral repertoire.  For a half century, from 1962 to 2012, Hemke was a full-time faculty music educator at Northwestern University's Bienen School of Music.  In 2002, Hemke was named Associate Dean Emeritus of the School of Music.  Hemke retired from Northwestern University in 2012.  From the start of his career in the early 1960s, building on the achievements of earlier influential American teachers of classical saxophone — including those of Larry Teal, Joseph Allard, Cecil Leeson, Sigurd Raschèr, and Vincent Abato — Hemke, and a handful of peer American saxophonists — including Eugene Rousseau and Donald Sinta — helped build American saxophone repertoire through composers that included Muczynski, Creston, Stein, Heiden, and Karlins.  Journalist and author Michael Segell, in his 2005 book, The Devil's Horn, called Hemke "The Dean of Saxophone Education in America." Hemke died on April 17, 2019.

Formal education 

From 1955 to 1956, Hemke studied saxophone with Marcel Mule at the Paris Conservatoire National de Musique et de Declamation, earning in 1956 the Premier Prix diploma.  Hemke holds the distinction of being the first American saxophonist to earn a Premier Prix diploma from the Paris Conservatory.  In 1958, Hemke earned a Bachelor of Science degree in music education from University of Wisconsin–Milwaukee.  In 1962, he earned a Master of Music degree from the Eastman School of Music.  In 1975, Hemke earned an A.Mus.D. degree from the University of Wisconsin–Madison.

In primary and secondary school, until the start of college, Hemke studied saxophone with Eddie Schmidt, a jobbing teacher, band director in Milwaukee, and a close friend of Ralph Joseph Hermann (1914–1994) — musician, composer, songwriter, and music publisher.  Hemke was highly influenced by Schmidt's recording of Marcel Mule — and also of his recordings of Al Gallodoro, and Freddy Gardner.  At the University of Wisconsin-Milwaukee, Hemke studied with Jay Morton, teacher of woodwinds.  Hemke did not have a formal saxophone teacher at Eastman, but while there, studied reeds with clarinetist Stanley Hasty (1920–2011), flute repertoire with Joseph Mariano (1911–2007), and oboe repertoire with Robert Sprenkle (1914–1988).

Teaching career
Hemke taught saxophone at Northwestern's School of Music for fifty years.  He began in 1962 as a teaching associate.  In 1964 he became an assistant professor and was appointed chairman of the newly formed Winds and Percussion Instruments Department.  In 1967 Hemke was elevated to associate professor; on September 1, 1975, Full Professor; and on September 1, 1991, chairman of the Department of Music Performance Studies at the School of Music. Hemke served as senior associate dean for administration in the School of Music from 1995 to 2001.  In 2002, Hemke was named the Louis and Elsie Snydacker Eckstein Professor of Music and also named associate dean emeritus of the School of Music. He retired from full-time teaching in 2012.  As a music educator in higher education, Hemke has taught hundreds of saxophonists, many of whom have flourished as performing artists and music educators of international rank. From 2013 until his death, Hemke served as artistic director and taught during summers at the Frederick L. Hemke Saxophone Institute, located at Snow Pond Center for the Arts in Sidney, ME.

 Selected former students:

 Jan Berry BakerAssociate Professor of SaxophoneUniversity of California, Los Angeles
 Roger BirkelandProfessor of SaxophoneElmhurst College
 James BishopDirector of Instrumental MusicEastern Florida State College, Cocoa, FL
 Robert Black  1985 "Grammy" award for "FACADE" recording as member of Chicago Pro Musica. Saxophonist on call with Chicago Symphony Orchestra 1973 to 2009. Former of instructor of Saxophone DePaul and Roosevelt University.  2nd Soprano saxophone on George Solti's Chicago Symphony recording of David DelTredici's "The Final Alice" with Dr. Hemke as 1st Soprano Saxophone. Owner of "The Saxophone Shop", Evanston, Il 1974 to 2004.
 Ron BlakeProfessor of Jazz SaxophoneJuilliardJazz performer andrecording artist
 Dave Bomberg
 Paul BroProfessor of SaxophoneIndiana State University
 Steve ColeInternational jazz performer andrecording artist
 David DeesProfessor of SaxophoneTexas Tech University
 Geoffrey Deibel, DMAAssistant Professor of Saxophone andDirector of Jazz StudiesFlorida State University
 Mark EngebretsonProfessor of Composition andElectronic Music University of North Carolina at Greensboro
 Susan FancherSaxophone InstructorDuke University
 Dan FerriTeacher & ownerDRF StudiosMaitland, FloridaSaxophone InstructorStetson UniversityDeland, Florida
 Chico FreemanJazz saxophonist
 Jason FrittsTeacher and Performer
 Bunky GreenDirector of Jazz StudiesUniversity of North Florida
 Jeffrey Loeffert, DMA Director and ProfessorOklahoma State University
 Jonathan HeltonProfessor of Saxophone University of Florida
 Frederic J.B. Hemke Professor of SaxophoneNorthern State University
 James S. HillProfessor of SaxophoneOhio State University
 William HochkeppelProfessor of SaxophoneUniversity of Louisiana at Lafayette
 James Kasprzyk Founder of Chicago Saxophone Quartet as Baritone Saxophone. State Department tour with Northwestern University Quartet 1966. 
 Eric HonourProfessor of MusicDirector of Music TechnologyUniversity of Central Missouri
 Jeremy JustesonProfessor of SaxophoneKutztown University of Pennsylvania
 Gail B. LevinskyProfessor of SaxophoneSusquehanna University
 Anders LundegardInternational performer
 Joseph MurphyProfessor of SaxophoneMansfield University of Pennsylvania
 Nathan NabbProfessor of SaxophoneStephen F. Austin State University
 Ryo Noda
 Stephen J. ParkerTeacher, PerformerNaples philharmonic
 Harvey PittelProfessor of SaxophoneUniversity of Texas at Austin
 Scott PluggeDirector of the School of MusicProfessor of SaxophoneSam Houston State University
 Debra RichtmeyerProfessor of SaxophoneUniversity of Illinois
 Timothy RobertsAssociate Professor of SaxophoneShenandoah University
 Johnny SalinasVisiting Assistant Professor of SaxophoneOklahoma State University
 John SampenProfessor of SaxophoneBowling Green State University
 David SanbornInternational jazz performerand recording artist
 Andy SnitzerInternational jazz performer andrecording artist
 William H. StreetProfessor of SaxophoneUniversity of Alberta
 Masahito SugiharaProfessor of SaxophoneSam Houston State University
 Matthew YoungloveAssistant Professor of SaxophoneTennessee Tech University
 Naomi SullivanProfessor of SaxophoneBirmingham Conservatoire
 Michael Rene TorresAssistant Professor of Practice, Saxophone and CompositionOhio State University
 Shawn TracyProfessor of Jazz SaxophoneMerit School of Music
 Jeremy WilliamsonTeacherSeminole State College andSeminole County Public Schools
 Kathleen MitchellProfessor of SaxophoneThe College of New Jersey

 Steven JordheimProfessor of SaxophoneLawrence University

Other positions

Hemke was well known as the designer of a line of reeds which bear the trademark "Frederick L. Hemke Reeds."   Rico Reeds began making the brand in 1982.  Hemke was an artist-clinician for The Selmer Company, the North American distributor of saxophones made in France by the Paris firm, Henri Selmer Paris. In 1979 Hemke was host for the Sixth World Saxophone Congress held at Northwestern University, Evanston, Illinois.

Performing career 
Hemke was an internationally acclaimed saxophone artist. Hemke has appeared extensively as a solo artist and has given master classes and lectures in the United States, Canada, Scandinavia, and the Far East. He performed with the Chicago Symphony Orchestra and many other orchestras. He premiered several works for saxophone, including Allan Pettersson's Symphony No. 16 (February 24, 1983) and James Di Pasquale's Sonata for tenor saxophone. Di Pasquale, a prolific composer, had studied saxophone with Hemke and Sigurd Rascher.

Selected performances
 Hemke made his New York debut on April 16, 1962, at the Town Hall, a storied concert venue that had its first-ever classical saxophone performance on February 5, 1937 — by Cecil Leeson.  Hemke performed compositions by Pascal, Lantier, Rueff, Hartley, and Stein and arrangements by Mule of Bach and Leclair.
 Premier, February 27, 2014, Augusta Read Thomas, Hemke Concerto, Prisms of Light, for solo alto saxophone and orchestra
 "Illuminations"
 "Sunrise Ballad"
 "Chasing Radiance"
 "Solar Rings"
 Hemke, saxophone, with the New Haven Symphony Orchestra, William Boughton conducting
 Recorded at Woolsey Hall, New Haven, Connecticut, February 27, 2014
 Commissioned as a retirement gift to Fred Hemke by current and former students; the composer, Thomas, had been Hemke's colleague at Northwestern
 From the album, A Portrait of Augusta Read Thomas, Nimbus Records (CD) (2014);

Advocacy for B tenor saxophone 
In a traditional modern saxophone quartet — B soprano, E alto, B tenor, and E baritone saxophone — repertoire and popularity for solo classical was, and still is, dominated by B soprano and E alto saxophone. Bucking the trend, Hemke spent time focusing on the B tenor as a classical solo instrument, as evidenced by the release of his 1971 solo album, Music for Tenor Saxophone.  In orchestral music, the tenor is known as one of the three saxophone voices in Ravel's Boléro — originally performed by two saxophonists, one on E sopranino and one on tenor doubling on B soprano. Recordings by tenor saxophone virtuoso James Houlik and others notwithstanding, classical tenor saxophone recordings make up a small portion of the classical saxophone repertoire and discography universe.

Selected discography 

Solo recordings
 Contest Music for Saxophone, Lapider Records M 249-04, distributed by H. & A. Selmer, Elkhart (LP) (1962)
  (stereo) (LP)
  (mono) (cassette)
  (mono) (LP)
  (mono) (LP)
  (LP)
  (LP)
 James Jacobs Edmonds (1931–2002), piano
 Hemke performed on a Selmer Mark VI

 Side 1
 Matrix N° XCTV-87627 (mono)
 Matrix N° RG 576A (stereo)
 
 Side 2
 Matrix N° XCTV-87628 (mono)
 Matrix N° RG 576A (stereo)
 
 Music for Tenor Saxophone, Brewster Records BR 1204 (LP) (1971); 
 Milton Lewis Granger (born 1947), piano
 Album cover art: Fred Hemke
 Notes by Charles (Chuck) Brewster Hawes, PhD (born 1945)
 Sonata, for tenor saxophone and piano, by James Di Pasquale
 A Ballad in Time and Space, by William Duckworth
 Poem, for tenor saxophone and piano, by Walter Hartley
 Music for Tenor Saxophone and Piano, by Martin William Karlins

 The American Saxophone, Brewster Records BR 1203 (LP) (1971); 
 Milton Lewis Granger (born 1947), piano
 Album cover art: Fred Hemke
 Notes by Alan Burrage Stout (born 1932)
 Concerto, for alto saxophone, by Ingolf Dahl
 Farewell, by Warren Benson
 Concerto, for alto saxophone, Karel Husa
 Aeolian Song, by Warren Benson

 Music for Tenor Saxophone (1971) and The American Saxophone (1971) was
 Re-issued as a compilation under the title:
The American Saxophone, EnF Records 1203-2 (CD) (2006); 

 Simple Gifts, EnF Records (CD) (2006); 
 Douglas Cleveland, organ
 Recorded at Alice Miller Chapel, Northwestern University on the Æolian-Skinner Organ and at Trinity United Methodist Church, Wilmette, Illinois, on the 2001 Reuter Organ

 Fascinating Rhythm, Sins Of My Old Age, EnF Records (CD) (2010); 
 The Music of George Gershwin
 Hemke, Alto Saxophone
 Figard String Quintet: Tracy Figard, violin; Catherine Price, violin; Kristin Figard, viola; Sam Norlund, cello; Douglas Nestler, double bass
 Notes by Jonah L. Blum (born 1976) (in English) and Hemke
 Cover art by Hemke

 Premier, February 27, 2014, Augusta Read Thomas, Hemke Concerto, Prisms of Light, for solo alto saxophone and orchestra
 "Illuminations"
 "Sunrise Ballad"
 "Chasing Radiance"
 "Solar Rings"
 Hemke, saxophone, with the New Haven Symphony Orchestra, William Boughton, conducting
 Recorded at Woolsey Hall, New Haven, Connecticut, February 27, 2014
 Commissioned as a retirement gift to Fred Hemke by current and former students; the composer, Thomas, had been Hemke's colleague at Northwestern
 From the album, A Portrait of Augusta Read Thomas, Nimbus Records (CD) (2014); 

Ensemble recordings
 Hemke has recorded with the Eastman Wind Ensemble, and The University of Chicago Contemporary Chamber Players.

 Symphony No. 16, by Allan Pettersson, Stockholm Philharmonic Orchestra, Yuri Ahronovitch conducting, Swedish Society Discofil (LP) (1985);  and (CD) (1994) 
 Recorded at the Stockholm Concert Hall, October 17 & 18, 1984

 Northwestern University Wind Ensemble, John Philip Paynter (1928–1996) (nl) conducting
 Recorded November 1976
 4th work: Concerto for Saxophone and Orchestra of Wind Instruments, by Ross Lee Finney, Hemke, alto saxophone

 Music by Warren Benson, CRI Records SD-433 & SD 418 (LP) (1981); 
 Hemke, E alto saxophone
 With the Kronos Quartet: David Harrington, violin; John Sherba, violin; Hank Dutt, viola; Joan Jeanrenaud, cello
 Recorded November 27, 1978, Kresge Recording Studios, Eastman School of Music
 First work: The Dream Net, quintet for saxophone and string quartet, commissioned by Hemke
 "Slow" (audio)
 "Quick" (audio)
 "Flexing" (audio)

 Notes by Carter Harman
 For soprano, violoncello, trumpet, E alto saxophone, French horn, piano, tympani, cymbals, tomtoms, irons, and gongs
 Bethany Beardslee, soprano, Contemporary Chamber Players of the University of Chicago
 Ralph Shapey conducting
 Re-released CRI Records (CD) (1995); 
 Re-released CRI Records (CD) (2007); 

 Concerto for Saxophone and Winds by Paul Creston, Interlochen Arts Academy Records (1978)
 Interlochen Arts Academy Wind Ensemble, Dennis L. Johnson (born 1946) conducting
 33rd Annual Midwestern Conference on School Vocal and Instrumental Music
 Performed live, January 21, 1978, Hill Auditorium, University of Michigan, Ann Arbor

 Concerto for Saxophone and Wind Orchestra by Ingolf Dahl, University of Wisconsin–Madison Records (1972); 
 University of Wisconsin–Madison Wind Ensemble, (H. Robert Reynolds) conducting

Chicago Symphony Orchestra
 Pictures at an Exhibition, by Mussorgsky, orchestrated by Ravel, Ozawa conducting (1968); 
 

 L'Arlésienne Suites Nos. 1 and 2, by Bizet, RCA Red Seal LSC-2939 (LP) (1967); 
 Jean Martinon conducting
 Re-released RCA Camden Classics Victrola CCV 5011 (LP) (1971)
 Re-released RCA VICS 1593 (LP) (1971); 
 Re-released RCA (LP) (1977); 
 Re-released RCA LPS 9845 (LP)

 Age of Gold (ballet suite), by Shostakovich, RCA Red Seal GL 42916 (LP) (1968); 
 Stokowski conducting
 Recorded February 20–21, 1968, Medinah Temple, Chicago
 Re-released RCA Red Seal LSC 3133 (LP) (1970); 
 Re-released RCA Red Seal (LP) (1975); 
 Re-released RCA Red Seal (LP) (1979); 
 Re-released RCA Red Seal (CD) (1997); 
 Also re-released with several various compilations
 Boléro, by Ravel, Quintessence PMC 1017 (1977); 
 Martinon conducting

 Boléro, by Ravel, Decca Matrix N° ZAL 14720 (LP)
 Solti conducting
 Recorded May 1976, Medinah Temple, Chicago
 Original release Decca (1977)
 Original release London Records (LP) (1977); 
 Re-released Decca (CD) (1996); 
 
 Re-released Universal Classics (2003); 
 Re-released Deutsche Grammophon (2003); 
  and 

 Final Alice, by Del Tredici, Decca, London (LP) (1981); 
 Barbara Hendricks, soprano; Fred Hemke, Robert Black, soprano saxophones; Fred Spector, mandolin; Frederic Chrislip, tenor banjo; Herman Troppe, accordion; Solti conducting
 Recorded twice. Once in 1976 after World Premier and again 1978, after second live performance series before Solti and his exacting standards would allow release. Medinah Temple, Chicago
 Re-released on Decca Eloquence 442 995, Australia (CD) (2008);

Selected publications 
Educational publications
 The dissertation explores in depth the saxophone's history and gradual acceptance in the realm of symphonic music
 On Reading Music: An Information Processing Analysis, by Gilbert Koreb Krulee (born 1924) & Hemke (1980); 
The Selmer Series, Elkhart, Indiana
 "Teacher's Guide to the Saxophone," by Hemke, Elkhart, Indiana: Selmer (1977); 
 The Orchestral Saxophone, by Hemke & Walker L Smith, Elkhart, Indiana: Selmer (1975); 
 A Comprehensive Listing of Saxophone Literature, by Hemke, Elkhart, Indiana: Selmer (1975); 

Commissions and dedications
 "Music for Tenor Saxophone and Piano," by M. William Karlins (1969, ©1972); 
 Symphony No. 16, for orchestra with bravura alto saxophone, by Allan Pettersson, commissioned by Hemke (1979, ©1989); 
 The Dream Net, 1974, revised 1978, by Warren Benson, commissioned by Hemke, dedicated to Alec Wilder, premiered by Hemke May 23, 1975, with the Eckstein Quartet, Lutken Hall, Northwestern University; 
 "Wind Rose", by Warren Benson (1966), commissioned by Hemke and the Northwestern University Saxophone, dedicated to Hemke and the Northwestern University Saxophone Quartet on their tour of Asia, Spring, 1966; 
 Little Suite, by Walter Hartley, for Hemke, for baritone saxophone and piano (1974); 
 5 Etudes for Alto Saxophone, by Robert Lemay (fr), Courlay: Éditions Fuzeau
 2000; 
 Commissioned by Jean-François Guay
 Homage to Marcel Mule, Jean-Marie Londeix, Eugene Rousseau, Fred Hemke, Daniel Deffayet
 Funded in part by the Conseil des arts et des lettres du Québec
 Episode, for saxophone quartet, by Jared Tozier Spears (born 1936), commissioned by Hemke (1969); 
 Symphony for Saxophone and Wind Band, by Gerald Eugene Kemner (1932–2006) (composed around 1962 for Hemke)

Music editions
 Hemke has edited works for saxophone solos and saxophone ensembles, twenty-five of which are part of the Frederick Hemke Saxophone Series published by the Southern Music Company.

Awards and honors

Hemke's saxophone and accessories 
Hemke had been a primary design consultant for the S-80 mouthpiece manufactured by Henri Selmer Paris.  For alto saxophone, Hemke uses a custom version of the S-80.  The mouthpiece is metal with a square chamber.

The Selmer Mark VII E alto and B tenor saxophones, introduced in 1974, were designed in consultation with Hemke.

Miscellaneous 
 For research, while in grad school at Eastman, Hemke had borrowed from H. & A. Selmer one of the world's original saxophones made by Adolphe Sax around 1860.  On September 17, 1960, a custodian unwittingly stuffed a cardboard box containing the instrument into an incinerator and completely destroyed it.  The only other one in existence was in a Paris museum.
 Hemke has been a lifelong visual artist.  His works are in the Regenstein Hall of Music at Northwestern University and on the covers of his albums.

Audio samples and videography 
 , by Allan Pettersson
 Stockholm Philharmonic Orchestra, Yuri Ahronovitch conducting, Swedish Society Discofil (1994); 

 , by Claudio Gabriele (composed 2005)
 For 12 saxophones
 North American premier
 Northwestern University Saxophone Ensemble, Hemke conducting

 , by Claudio Gabriele (composed 2011)
 For 9 saxophones
 World premiere, 2008, Pick-Steiger Concert Hall, Evanston, Illinois
 Northwestern University Saxophone Ensemble, Hemke conducting

Hemke Legacy Tribute: May 29 – June 3, 1912, Northwestern University
 
 7:30 , May 31, 2012, Pick-Staiger Concert Hall, Northwestern University
 Songs by Gershwin, arranged by Jonah L. Blum (born 1976)
 Northwestern University Chamber Orchestra, Robert Hasty conducting
 Scenes from Porgy and Bess
 "Summertime"
 "Bess, You Is My Woman Now"
 "I Got Plenty o' Nuttin' "
 "Gone, Gone, Gone"
 "I Loves You, Porgy"
 "Summertime"

 
 (Brahms's Variations on the St. Anthony Chorale by Haydn)
 Arranged by Gary S. Bricault (born 1952) at the request of Fred Hemke
 Northwestern University Alumni Saxo Orchestra, Stephen Alltop conducting
 Performed June 3, 2012, at Northwestern University
 105 saxophones: 3 E sopraninos, 23 B sopranos, 35 E altos, 25 B tenors, 12 E baritones, 6 B basses, and 1 E contra bass tubax

 , Eric Howell Music (DVD) (2012);

Further reading

Interview with Frederick Hemke, April 20, 2000

Notes

References

American classical saxophonists
American male saxophonists
Musicians from Evanston, Illinois
Musicians from Milwaukee
University of Wisconsin–Madison College of Letters and Science alumni
University of Wisconsin–Milwaukee alumni
Northwestern University faculty
1935 births
2019 deaths
Classical saxophonists
Distinguished Service to Music Medal recipients
21st-century American saxophonists
Classical musicians from Illinois
Classical musicians from Wisconsin
21st-century American male musicians
20th-century classical musicians
20th-century American male musicians
20th-century American saxophonists